Butterfly is a 1982 American independent crime drama film co-written and directed by Matt Cimber, based on the 1947 novel The Butterfly by James M. Cain. The starring cast includes Stacy Keach, Pia Zadora, Lois Nettleton, Ed McMahon, James Franciscus, Edward Albert, and Orson Welles. The original music score was composed by Ennio Morricone. The film was financed by Zadora's husband, Israeli multimillionaire Meshulam Riklis, at an estimated cost of US$3.5 million.

It received 10 nominations for the 3rd Golden Raspberry Awards (including Worst Picture), with Zadora winning Worst Actress and Worst New Star, and McMahon winning Worst Supporting Actor. Nevertheless, Zadora won Best Female Newcomer at the 39th Golden Globe Awards for her role (over Elizabeth McGovern and Kathleen Turner). This occurred after her husband flew members of the Hollywood Foreign Press Association to Las Vegas to hear Zadora sing, producing accusations that the award had been "bought". Orson Welles' portrayal of Judge Rauch was nominated for both supporting actor categories at the Golden Globes Awards and at the Golden Raspberry Awards.

Plot
In 1937, in a small mining town on the Nevada–Arizona border, Jess Tyler is the caretaker of an unused silver mine. His wife, Belle Morgan, deserted him 10 years earlier and took their daughters, Janey and Kady, when she ran off with another man, Moke Blue. A 17-year-old Kady shows up at Jess's place, telling him her mother Belle is running a brothel, and one of the clients got Kady pregnant with a son, Danny. Danny's father is Wash Gillespie, the son of the wealthy mine owner, who refused to marry her. Kady is money hungry and has returned home to steal silver from the mine. Jess, initially opposed to stealing silver from the mine, relents and says they can take small scraps after she seduces him. They work in the mine together; afterwards, while Kady takes a bath, Jess ends up giving her a massage but stops short of having sex.

Soon after, Wash comes to town and proposes to Kady, and she accepts. Belle, suffering from severe tuberculosis, arrives with Blue and a mutual friend, Ed Lamey, ostensibly to celebrate the engagement. Blue insinuates that he knows about the theft, and while the others are out of the house, Belle stabs him with a hat pin, and he kills her in self-defence.

Jess realizes that Ed must have witnessed the theft and told Blue. Jess rushes to the mine, where Blue is frantically pillaging for silver and taunts him. Jess sees a "butterfly" birthmark near his navel, similar to one on baby Danny, and believes that Blue is Danny's father.  Enraged, Jess shoots him. Before Jess leaves him to die, Blue reveals that Kady is his daughter.

Returning to the Gillespies, Jess lies and tells them that Danny is Blue's son. Wash decides to break off the engagement, but Jess stops him from talking to Kady about it himself. When Wash fails to arrive on the day of the wedding, she despondently resorts to her original plan to steal the silver. She goes to the mine with Jess, where the two have sex while Ed looks on. The police arrive with warrants for the arrests of Jess and Kady, and they are charged with incest.

At the hearing, Judge Rauch calls it "a crime against nature, shocking and repulsive to every basic sense of propriety, decency, and good citizenship." Jess pleads guilty, saying he forced her, so that Kady will not be punished. Jess is sentenced to 10 years in prison, and Kady objects, saying that their relationship was consensual. The judge threatens her with reform school, 10 years in prison, and Danny becoming a ward of the state. Jess reveals that Moke Blue is Kady's real father and the proof is the birthmark. Ed then reveals he is Moke Blue's half-brother and has the same birthmark and did not tell her because of the silver. The case is dismissed.

Wash is waiting outside the courthouse for Kady, who realizes what Jess did and is angry, but quickly forgives him. She says she loves him, but differently from how she loves Wash. She chooses Wash because of the life he can provide for Danny.

Cast

Awards and nominations

References

External links
 
 

1982 films
1980s English-language films
1982 crime drama films
Films based on American novels
Films based on works by James M. Cain
Films set in Arizona
Films set in the 1930s
American independent films
Films directed by Matt Cimber
Films scored by Ennio Morricone
American crime drama films
Incest in film
1982 independent films
Golden Raspberry Award winning films
1980s American films